The KAFFED or the Federation of Caucasian Associations is the largest Circassian association in Turkey and is a union of Circassian and other North Caucasian associations from various provinces of Turkey. The Federation describes itself as "criticizing Russia's authoritarian attitude that ignores the existence and rights of the North Caucasian peoples". The KAFFED Chairman has been banned from entering the Russian Federation. KAFFED was the founding member of the International Circassian Association (ICA) until it left in 2022 due to "ICA acting as a Russian puppet organisation".

References 

Organizations based in Ankara
2003 establishments in Turkey
Organizations established in 2003
Non-governmental organizations
Non-profit organizations based in Turkey
Community organizations
Social movement organizations
Stateless nationalism in Europe